Victor Jory (November 23, 1902 – February 12, 1982) was a Canadian-American actor of stage, film, and television. He initially played romantic leads, but later was mostly cast in villainous or sinister roles, such as  Oberon in A Midsummer Night's Dream (1935) and carpetbagger Jonas Wilkerson in Gone with the Wind (1939). From 1959 to 1961, he had a lead role in the 78-episode television police drama Manhunt. He also recorded numerous stories for Peter Pan Records and was a guest star in dozens of television series as well as a supporting player in dozens of theatrical films, occasionally appearing as the leading man.

Biography
Born in Dawson City, Yukon, to American parents, he was the boxing and wrestling champion of the US Coast Guard during his military service, and he kept his burly physique. He graduated from the Martha Oatman School of the Theater in Los Angeles.

Jory toured with theatre troupes and appeared on Broadway, before making his Hollywood debut in 1930. He initially played romantic leads, but later was mostly cast as the villain, probably due to his distinctive, seemingly coal-black eyes that might be perceived as 'threatening'. He made over 150 films and dozens of TV episodes, as well as writing two plays. His long career in radio included starring in the series Dangerously Yours.

He is remembered for his roles as malevolent Injun Joe in The Adventures of Tom Sawyer (1938), Jonas Wilkerson, the opportunistic overseer of the slaves at Tara in Gone with the Wind, and as Lamont Cranston, or 'The Shadow', in the 1940 serial film The Shadow. He also portrayed Oberon in Max Reinhardt's film adaptation of Shakespeare's play A Midsummer Night's Dream (1935) starring James Cagney, Dick Powell and Olivia de Havilland.

He co-starred in seven Hopalong Cassidy films between 1941 and 1943, usually cast in the role of a villain with the exception of his role as a broad-shouldered lumberjack in the film Riders of the Timberline (1941).

He starred in the radio series Dangerously Yours beginning in mid-1944. The series was retitled Matinee Theater in October 1944 and ran through April 1945. Each episode was a dramatic reworking of famous literary works. The first episode dated July 2, 1944, was "The Highwayman", a dramatic interpretation of the Alfred Noyes poem.

In 1946, he narrated "Tubby the Tuba" for children, which was inducted in 2005 in the National Recording Registry and also introduces the orchestra to young listeners. The story tells of a tuba who does not fit in. He also narrated "Bumpo the Ballerina", whose title character is an elephant.

From 1959 to 1961, he appeared with Patrick McVey in the 78-episode syndicated television police drama Manhunt. Jory played the lead role of Detective Lieutenant Howard Finucane. McVey was cast as police reporter Ben Andrews.

In 1957, Jory was cast in the role of the Southern Baptist pastor George Washington Truett of the First Baptist Church of Dallas,  in the episode "Lone Star Preacher" of the syndicated religion anthology series Crossroads. In 1960 he portrayed the aging, malevolent husband of Anna Magnani’s character in The Fugitive Kind, adapted from a play by Tennessee Williams.

In 1962, he was cast as Deacon Lee in the two-part episode "Policemen Die Alone" of Leslie Nielsen's ABC crime drama The New Breed. That same year, Jory guest-starred as Mike Dahlback in the episode "Ride to a Fall" in the NBC modern Western series Empire, which featured Richard Egan as rancher Jim Redigo. He also played Helen Keller's father in The Miracle Worker, for which his co-stars Anne Bancroft and Patty Duke won Academy Awards.

In 1964, along with actresses Coleen Gray and Susan Seaforth, Jory testified before the United States Congress as part of "Project Prayer", arguing in favor of an amendment to the United States Constitution to restore school prayer, which the United States Supreme Court struck down in two decisions in 1962 and 1963.

Jory was on the faculty of the University of Utah, teaching acting in the Department of Theater. He endowed a scholarship for junior/senior students in the department known as the Victor Jory Scholarship, which continues to the current day.

The High Chaparral television episode "The Peacemaker" in 1968 featured Jory as a peace envoy attempting to negotiate a treaty with Apache Native American chief Cochise.

In the private-eye series Mannix, which starred Mike Connors as the title character, Jory played the Armenian-American detective's widowed father, Stefan Mannix—a grape farmer in "Summer Grove", a fictitious town in California's Central Valley near Fresno (which continues to have a large Armenian population). He appeared in two episodes,"Return to Summer Grove" (1969) and "Wine from These Grapes" (1971).

In 1977, near the end of his career, Jory guest starred as an aging Federal Bureau of Investigation agent in James Garner's The Rockford Files episode "The Attractive Nuisance".

Jory died on February 12, 1982, at the age of 79, from a heart attack in Santa Monica, California.

For his contribution to the motion-picture industry, Victor Jory was honored in 1960 with a star on the Hollywood Walk of Fame. His star is located at 6605 Hollywood Blvd.

Family
Jory married actress Jean Inness in 1929. They had two children, Jon and Jean. Jon Jory headed the Actors Theater of Louisville, Kentucky, for 31 years, which he helped to build into one of America's most respected regional theater companies. He left the job in 2000 to become professor of drama at the University of Washington in Seattle. His daughter Jean Jory Anderson was a public-relations director of the theater department at Utah State University in Logan.

Filmography

Film

Television

Radio appearances

References

External links

 
 
 

1902 births
1982 deaths
American male stage actors
Canadian male stage actors
American male film actors
Canadian male film actors
American male television actors
Canadian male television actors
Canadian people of American descent
Sportspeople from Yukon
United States Coast Guard enlisted
People from Dawson City
Male actors from Yukon
Male actors from Los Angeles
20th-century American male actors
20th-century Canadian male actors
Canadian emigrants to the United States